Zhuliangomyces is a genus of mushroom-forming fungi in the family Amanitaceae in order Agaricales. Analysis of DNA  sequences was used to show that Zhuliangomyces was separate from Limacella which is similar in appearance and the genus name Myxoderma was adopted. The name Myxoderma was previously used for a genus of Cyanobacteria and the fungal generic name was replaced by Zhuliangomyces.

References

Amanitaceae
Agaricales genera